Leaves are an Icelandic indie band formed in 2000.

History
Vocalist Arnar Gudjonsson was formerly the guitarist with Mower, and he was joined by Hallur Hallsson (bass guitar), Arnar Ólafsson (guitar, accordion), Bjarni Grímsson (drums), and Andri Ásgrímsson (keyboards).  Late in 2001 they played with Emiliana Torrini and drew early praise from the New York Times. They came to prominence in 2002 with their single "Race" (which reached number 66 in the UK Singles Chart), and début album, Breathe, drawing comparisons to groups such as Coldplay, Muse, The Verve and Doves. The album was released in the UK first to positive reviews, reaching number 71 in the UK Albums Chart, then was re-released in the United States, and a tour of both the UK and the U.S. followed. Their second album, The Angela Test, was released in 2005 and their third album, We Are Shadows, was released in 2009. The group's most recent album, See You in the Afterglow, arrived in 2013. In 2016, the group released a reworked version of "Breathe". In 2017 vocalist Arnar formed a solo project, Warmland.

The name of the band refers to Nick Drake's first album Five Leaves Left.

Members
Current
 Arnar Guðjónsson: lead vocals, piano, guitar
 Elís Pétursson: bass guitar
 Nói Steinn Einarsson: drums
 Andri Ásgrímsson: keyboards

Former
 Arnar Ólafsson: guitar, backing vocals
 Bjarni Grímsson: drums
 Hallur Hallsson: bass guitar

Discography

Albums
Breathe (2002), B-Unique – UK #71
The Angela Test (2005), Universal/Island
We Are Shadows (2009)
See You in the Afterglow (2013)

Singles
"Breathe" (2002), B-Unique – UK #99
"Race" (2002), B-Unique – UK #66
"Catch" (2002), B-Unique – split single with The Coral and Electric Soft Parade – UK #81
"Silence" (2002), B-Unique
"The Sensualist" (2013)

References

Icelandic indie rock groups
Musical groups from Reykjavík